Muppavarapu Venkaiah Naidu (born 1 July 1949) is an Indian politician who served as the 13th vice president of India from 2017 to 2022. He is the first Indian vice president born in independent India. He has also served as the minister of Housing and Urban Poverty Alleviation, Urban Development and Information and Broadcasting in the Modi Cabinet. 

Naidu has also served as the national president of Bhartiya Janta Party from 2002 to 2004. Earlier, he was the Union Cabinet Minister for Rural Development in the Atal Bihari Vajpayee government. He took the oath as the vice president of India and the chairman of the Rajya Sabha (ex-officio as the Vice President) on 11 August 2017.

Early life 

Venkaiah Naidu was born on 1 July 1949 at Chavatapalem village (near Venkatachalam) in Nellore district of Andhra Pradesh, to Rangaiah Naidu and Ramanamma. He completed his schooling from Zilla Parshad High School, Bucchireddy Palem (Nellore), and pursued his bachelor's degree in politics and diplomatic studies from V. R. College, Nellore. Later, he acquired a bachelor's degree in law with specialisation in international law from Andhra University College of Law, Visakhapatnam. He was a swayamsevak in the Rashtriya Swayamsevak Sangh and joined ABVP during his college days. He was elected as the president of the students' union of colleges affiliated to the Andhra University. He came into the spotlight for his prominent role in the Jai Andhra Movement of 1972. While Kakani Venkata Ratnam led the movement from Vijayawada, Naidu took active part in the agitation in Nellore, until it was called off a year later.

In 1974, he became the convener of the anti-corruption Jayaprakash Narayan Chhatra Sangharsh Samiti of Andhra Pradesh. He took to the streets in protest against the Emergency and was imprisoned. From 1977 to 1980, he was president of its youth wing.

Political career
Both as a student leader and political figure, Naidu gained prominence as an orator, who championed the cause of the farmers and the development of backward areas. His oratory skills and political activism propelled his political career and he was elected as an MLA to the Andhra Pradesh Legislative Assembly twice from Udaygiri constituency in Nellore district in 1978 and 1983. He rose to become one of the most popular leaders of the BJP in Andhra Pradesh.

After serving in various organisational posts of the BJP at the state and national level, he was elected as a member of the Rajya Sabha from Karnataka in 1998. He was re-elected twice, in 2004 and 2010, from Karnataka. He served as the party spokesperson from 1996 to 2000, bringing to the job his panache for quirky alliterations and similes. Unlike most politicians from southern India, Naidu made an effort to master Hindi, going on to address public rallies in northern India.

After the NDA victory in the 1999 general elections, he became the Union Cabinet Minister for Rural Development in the government headed by Prime Minister Atal Bihari Vajpayee. He was known for aggressively pushing for reforms in rural development and for the many schemes introduced during this period such as the 'Pradhan Mantri Gram Sadak Yojana'.

President of BJP (2002–04) 
Naidu succeeded Jana Krishnamurthi as the National President of the Bharatiya Janata Party in 2003. On 28 January 2004, he was elected unopposed for a full three-year term. After the defeat of the BJP-led NDA in the 2004 general elections, he resigned from his post on 18 October 2004 and was succeeded by L. K. Advani. However, he remained at the forefront of the BJP as one of its senior vice-presidents and an important campaigner. Naidu raised Special Status to Andhra Pradesh issue in Rajya Sabha (as opposition member in February 2014) and demanded special category state status to AP. The Prime Minister agreed to it, though it was not included in the AP Reorganization Act.

Minister of Urban Affairs 
Following the victory of the BJP in the 2014 general elections, he was sworn in as the Minister for Urban Development and Parliamentary Affairs on 26 May 2014.

Naidu is also involved with the Swarna Bharat Trust, a social service organization founded by him in Nellore. The trust runs a school for poor, orphaned and special-needs children and imparts self-employment training programs, especially for women and youth.

He was nominated by the BJP on 29 May 2016 for the Rajya Sabha from Rajasthan and was elected.

Vice Presidency (2017– 2022) 

On 5 July 2016, he concurrently served as Minister of Information and Broadcasting. A year later, he resigned from both offices to contest the 2017 vice presidential election. He won the election to become India's 13th Vice President. He obtained 516 votes against UPA candidate Gopalkrishna Gandhi, who received 244 votes. As his tenure ended, Naidu decided to move back to Hyderabad with his family and declared that he will resume his career in the service of the nation. He was succeeded by Jagdeep Dhankhar on 11 August 2022.

Positions held 
 1973–74: President, Students' Union, Andhra University
 1974: Convener, Lok Nayak Jai Prakash Narayan Yuvajana Chatra Sangharsha Samithi, Andhra Pradesh
 1977–80: President, Youth Wings of Janata Party, Andhra Pradesh
 1978–85: Member, Legislative Assembly, Andhra Pradesh (2 terms)
 1980–85: Leader, B.J.P Legislative Party in Andhra Pradesh
 1985–88: General Secretary, Andhra Pradesh State BJP
 1988–93: President, Andhra Pradesh State BJP
 1993 – September 2000: National General Secretary, Bharatiya Janata Party
 Secretary, BJP Parliamentary Board
 Secretary, BJP Central Election Committee
 Spokesperson of the BJP
 Since 1998: Member, Rajya Sabha from Karnataka (3 terms)
 30 September 2000 – 1 July 2002: Minister of Rural Development
 1 July 2002 – 5 October 2004: National President, Bharatiya Janata Party
 April 2005 - 10 August 2017: National Vice-President, Bharatiya Janata Party.
 2014–2017: Minister of Urban Development, Housing and Urban Poverty Alleviation and Parliamentary Affairs
 2016–2017: Minister of Information and Broadcasting
 2017–2022: Vice President of India

Awards and honours

State honours
:
Commander of the Order of the Green Crescent of the Comoros (3 August 2019)

Honorary degrees
University for Peace: Honorary Doctorate (Honoris causa) (8 March 2019)

References

External links

 Detailed Profile: Shri M. Venkaiah Naidu 

Venkaiah Naidu's Indian Express Column

|-

|-

|-

|-

|-

|-

|-

|-

|-

|-

1949 births
Bharatiya Janata Party politicians from Andhra Pradesh
Indian Hindus
Members of the Cabinet of India
Janata Party politicians
Living people
Narendra Modi ministry
People from Nellore
Ministers for Information and Broadcasting of India
Presidents of Bharatiya Janata Party
Rajya Sabha members from Karnataka
Rajya Sabha members from Rajasthan
Telugu people
Vice presidents of India